Doncaster Minster, formally the Minster and Parish Church of St George, is the Anglican minster church of Doncaster, South Yorkshire, England. It is a grade I listed building and was designed by architect designer George Gilbert Scott. The church was built in 1854–1858 to replace an earlier building destroyed by fire. It is an active place of worship and has a Schulze organ, a ring of eight bells, and a celebrated clock by Dent. The church is one of two parish churches to have minster status in South Yorkshire. The other is the minster church of Rotherham.

History

The original 12th-century Norman building burnt down on the last day of February 1853. This fire resulted in the loss of the medieval library which was above the south porch.

The current building was designed by architect Sir George Gilbert Scott in 1853 and constructed between 1854 and 1858 at a cost of £43,126 4s 5d. It was consecrated by the Archbishop of York on 14 October 1858.

The Minster today
The Minster is one of Doncaster's most architecturally important buildings evidenced by its Grade I listing and was described by Sir John Betjeman as "Victorian Gothic at its very best". It was given minster status as the Minster and Parish Church of St George by the Bishop of Sheffield on 17 June 2004. It is an active place of worship with regular services and is also used for civic services, arts events and other celebrations. The Minster is a member of the Major Churches Network, successor to the Greater Churches Network.

Amongst its treasures are a clock by Dent (the designer of the Palace of Westminster Clock, more usually known as Big Ben) and a spectacular 5 manual organ by the renowned German organ builder Edmund Schulze (1824–1877).

Vicars

 Walter de Thornton: 1320
 William Cooper (died 1403)
 John Jackson (the elder): 1650 to 1690
 John Jackson (son of the above): 1690 to 1706
 Patrick Dujon: 1706 to 1728
 Hollis Pigot: 1728 to 1762
 Henry Piggot: 1763
 The Revd Mr Hatfield:  1767 to 1785
 George William Auriol Hay-Drummond: 1785 to 1790
 Stephen Moore: 1790 to 1807
 Robert Affleck: 1807 to 1815
 John Sharpe: 1817 to 1860 
 Charles John Vaughan: 1860 to 1869 
 Francis Pigou: 1869 to 1875
 Edward Carr Glyn: 1875 to 1878 
 Charles Sisum Wright: 1878 to 1886
 Henry Tebbutt: 1886 to 1894
 John Nathaniel Quirk: 1901 to 1905 
 F.G. Sandford: 1905 to 1928 
 Richard Brook: 1928 to 19??
 Michael James Jackson: 1969 to 1973
 The Revd John Bird
 Canon C. Smith
 Canon Paul Shackerley
 The Revd David Stevens

Organs and organists

Organists and choirmasters

1862 Schulze Organ

Rising from the ashes

The medieval Parish Church of St George possessed a fine Harris organ of 1739–40. This instrument was praised by John Stanley, who declared “every pipe in the reed stops to be worth its weight in silver”. It grew from an original specification of some 24 stops to one of 51 stops and was reputed to be the largest organ in England except for York Minster, due to the efforts of Jeremiah Rogers (organist 1835–1879), who paid for much of the work himself. The organ had just been relocated from the west gallery to the chancel and its pedal extended to 32’ pitch, when it was consumed by fire, along with the entire building, on 28 February 1853.

The leading architect of the day, Sir George Gilbert Scott, was commissioned to rebuild the church, a task which he completed in only four years. Consecrated in 1858, the new church is the most cathedral-like of Scott's parish churches and is crowned by a  bell tower 170 feet high.

Jeremiah Rogers was desirous of commissioning an organ worthy of Scott's new church and set out to acquire “the best organ that could be obtained anywhere in the world”. Rogers made many visits around Europe inspecting famous organs, often in the company of his friend E. J. Hopkins (organist of the Temple Church).

J. F. Schulze and Sons

Johann Friedrich Schulze was born in Milbitz near Paulinzella, Thuringia, in 1794, and began making organs there in 1825. His first organs were for Horba (10 stops) and Milbitz (21 stops). In 1825, he moved to Paulinzella where his business increased and he undertook substantial contracts at Solingen and Bremen Cathedral. In 1851, he exhibited an organ at the Great Exhibition, reputedly at the express invitation of Prince Albert, himself a native of Thuringia. One of three foreign organs on exhibition, Schulze's instrument was a modest two manual of 15 stops. Subsequently, transferred to Northampton Guildhall, it was later destroyed. It presented several features which at the time were new to the country and aroused much interest, resulting in the award of a prize medal. The specification was as follows:

Specification

E. J. Hopkins, in the first edition of Grove's Dictionary of Music and Musicians, comments on Schulze's exhibition organ and describes the Lieblich Gedackt as “the invention of Schulze....singularly beautiful in quality of tone”. The Flauto Traverso he describes thus “double length in the upper part....the pipes being of wood bored and turned to a cylindrical shape were in reality so many actual flutes”. In addition he noted that the organ possessed two excellent free reeds.

The exhibition organ did not by itself produce any orders for the firm and it may have been Hopkins’ personal familiarity with some of the German instruments which finally clinched the Doncaster commission for Schulze. Hopkins visited the 1852 Schulze organ at Bremen Cathedral and was later to recall:

“The effect of the organ was exceedingly solemn, grand or soothing, according to whether I used the 16 and 8ft diapasons, the full organ, or the flutes and gedackts.  In fact, I never at any organ, in the whole course of my life, felt myself under such a great enchantment.  Indeed the excitement was so great that I had two or three times to leave the church in the most urgent state.”

Writing in The Organ, its History and Construction (E. J. Hopkins and E. F. Rimbault, Third Edition, London 1877), Hopkins describes a specification for an ideal 4 manual organ of 87 stops which bears a close resemblance to Doncaster.

The order was placed in 1857, originally for a three manual instrument. With the death of Johann Friedrich Schulze (1793–1858), it was left to his son, Heinrich Edmund Schulze (1824–1878), to take over as the innovative and creative force within the firm (see plate I). Edmund Schulze soon persuaded Rogers to enlarge the specification to a 5 manual instrument which was to be the largest church organ in the country with 94 registers over 5 manuals including 25 stops on the pedal department, exceeded only by Willis's organ for St. George's Hall, Liverpool of 1851.

In 1860 the main consignment of parts from Germany arrived at Hull. Much of the construction took place in the church itself where Edmund Schulze together with four or five men worked on the project for two years. One observer reputedly noted that the large 32 foot principal was cleverly made from the wooden packing cases of the shipment itself. According to Rogers, Schulze spent three weeks regulating and finishing the mixtures working from the early hours of the morning until midnight and sleeping on the bellows before resuming his labours. The new organ was dedicated at a service on 24 September 1862.

As a result of the publicity of the Doncaster organ, many other orders followed, especially in the North of England, including St Mary's Tyne Dock (1862), Meanwood Towers (1869, subsequently moved to Harrogate and finally to St Bartholomew's Armley), St Peter's Hindley (1873) and St Peter's Harrogate (1879).

Doncaster was to be the largest organ the firm were to build. Prior to this, Schulze's largest contract had been the 80 stop 4 manual instrument in the Marienkirche, Lübeck, completed in 1854 (destroyed in 1942), often regarded as a sister instrument to Doncaster. After the death of Edmund Schulze in 1878, the firm ceased trading the following year.

Innovations of Edmund Schulze

The Doncaster Schulze contained a number of technical innovations.  Huge pedal slider soundboards were built to enable each pedal stop to be available at two pitches, thus enabling an independent pedal section of some 25 registers including 2 mixtures, 4 mutations and 8 reeds, well able to support both classical and romantic repertoire.  In terms of sheer number of stops, though perhaps not in ranks, it exceeded its rival at St. George's Hall, Liverpool.

In addition to the provision of conventional beating reeds, Schulze provided two free reeds: the pedal Contra Posaune 32’ and Posaune 16’.  Doncaster possesses the only known example of this stop at 32’ pitch in England.

In order to obtain more definition in his pedal department, Schulze provided the first known example of a wooden 16’ Violone, fitted with a box mouth to steady the speech.

Other innovations included in the instrument were the triangular section Hohl Flute 8’ on the Great division and the use of wooden harmonic flutes.  Stop names and characteristics unfamiliar in this country included the Quintaten, Lieblich Gedackt, Gemshorn, Dolce, Terpodian and of course the famed wide mouthed ‘Schulze’ diapason.  The Flauto Traverso 8’ and the Flauto Traverso 4’, as noted by Hopkins, consist of cylindrical open flute pipes, made from Beech, bored and turned on a lathe.

The chief glory of the Doncaster Schulze is its bold Great Flue Chorus which extends from its manual 32’ to no fewer than 14 ranks of mixture (the Swell having to be content with a mere 12 mixture ranks).

Abbott & Smith

The original foot blowing gear required the services of four men to raise sufficient wind.  With the advent of modern technology, it was unsurprising that, in 1894, the Leeds firm of Abbott and Smith replaced it with a Shipley gas engine and compressor. At the same time, a new organ console was provided with a pneumatic stop action.  The Schulze key actions and the borrowed Solo manual remained.  They also converted the pedal action to pneumatic operation, with the new supply of wind allowing the addition of thumb pistons and other gadgetry.

The story is told of the “loss” of the choir mixture arising from the somewhat ill-advised attempt of a verger to search for a gas leak with a naked flame.  This action resulted in an explosion causing the loss of the original North Transept window and supposedly the Choir mixture.  Curiously there was no apparent sign of damage to the case pipes or any other ranks.  A probably more plausible explanation is that Edmund Schulze substituted the 2 rank Flauto Gambe in place of the Mixture originally specified in his father's quotation.

Norman & Beard and later works

In 1910 the only significant changes were made to the instrument with the replacement of Schulze's “borrowed” solo manual with an independent department in its own swell box.  Another new swell-box was provided for the echo organ making it in the words of Magnus Black “inaudible above the traffic except in the early hours of the morning”.  The echo swell box shutters have since been removed!  A large leathered No1 Diapason, standing in its own separate chest, was added to the Great at this time.  It was removed in 1959.

The sum total of the Norman & Beard changes was the addition of 8 new stops (i.e. the Solo division and the Swell Celestes).  It is believed that the wind pressure to the Great Reeds was increased, but no other changes were made to the voicing.

In 1935 J W Walker & Sons provided a new electro-pneumatic action and radiating terraced stop tab console on the south side of the choir (see plate VI).  Further work was carried out by Walkers in 1959 including the replacement of the original pedal chests, which after 100 years service were no longer reliable.  The Walker console was removed in 1999 when Andrew Carter installed a replacement 5 manual drawstop console built by Nicholson.  The blowing plant and Great action were overhauled at this time.

Critical Appreciation

The organ at Doncaster Minster is the Magnum Opus of Edmund Schulze and is the largest instrument that the firm produced.  One of the largest organs in Europe, it is no exaggerated claim that this single instrument revolutionised the British organ and led to a complete reappraisal of the classical organ.  Doncaster became, and still is, a place of pilgrimage for musicians and organ builders alike.

One example of its significance was the reaction of the Victorian architect, T.C. Lewis, who became a follower of Schulze and set up on his own account as an organ builder.  Lewis, whose famous instrument at Southwark Cathedral owes much to Doncaster, had high praise for the Doncaster instrument:

“...anything finer it is, I believe, impossible to imagine...it is by far the grandest instrument I have ever heard.”

Dr. Nicholas Thistlethwaite in “The Making of the Victorian Organ” Cambridge 1990, states:

“The Doncaster organ proved to be one of the two most influential organs built in England during the second half of the century.  Schulze’s work and especially his monumental organ at Doncaster, established a new ideal.  His later English work was to be received with equal respect, but it was Doncaster that showed the way.”

The historical importance of the Doncaster instrument to the present day lies in the fact that it was sufficiently good to escape the almost continual rebuilding that similar instruments of the period underwent.  Sadly similar instruments at St. George's Hall Liverpool, York Minster and Birmingham Town Hall found themselves undergoing regular rebuilds to keep up to date with the latest organ fashion.

A number of works have been written specifically for the Doncaster Schulze; these include Francis Jackson's Fourth Organ Sonata and a Trio Sonata by Magnus Black (organist 1957–1995).

Magnus Black summed up its musical significance thus:

“The classical revival....led to an appreciation of well-balanced manual choruses and independent pedal departments......These are among the features of the Doncaster Schulze.  The German Romantic organ never lost its connections with its classical predecessor and many important features relate it to the organs of Bach’s time.”

Andrew Wilson

Specification

Manual compass C to a³
Pedal compass C to f¹ (originally to e¹)

 Stops added by Norman & beard 1910.  The original Solo division consisted of stops borrowed from the Swell.    The Vox Humana was originally playable only from the Solo division.

8 thumb pistons to Great
8 thumb pistons to Swell
8 thumb pistons to general combinations
6 thumb pistons to Choir
3 thumb pistons to Echo
4 thumb pistons to Solo
Thumb pistons for So-Pd, Sw-Pd, So-Gt, Sw-Gt, Gt-Pd, Ch-Pd
8 toe pistons to Great
8 toe pistons to Swell
Reversible toe piston for Gt-Pd
Great and Pedal combinations coupled
Generals on Swell toe pistons
Balanced Swell and Solo pedals

16 levels of departmental memory
64 levels of memory on generals

Wind Pressures

Swell Flue    	3 ½"	Swell Reeds  	6"
Great Flue    	3 ½"	Great Reeds  	5"
Choir    	2 ¾"	Echo    	2 ¼"
Solo  	 	6"	Solo Tuba 	15"
Pedal Reeds 	5"	Pedal Flue 	3 ¾" and 5"

Chronology of Main Works

 1862	Edmund Schulze & Son, Paulinzella. Tracker and Barker lever action.
 1894	Abbott & Smith, Leeds. New console and tubular pneumatic stop action.
 1896	Abbott & Smith removed foot blowing gear and installed Shipley gas engine and compressor.
 1910  Norman & Beard provided a new Solo organ together with 5 new stops to Solo organ & 2 Swell strings at a cost of £985. Large open 	diapason added to Great (removed in 1958).
 1935	J W Walker & Sons Ltd, London. New stop tab console with electric action.
 1958	J W Walker & Sons Ltd, London cleaned the organ and provided new soundboards to the pedal.
 1983	Swell and choir organs restored after water damage.
 1989	Cleaned after fire in church.
 1992	J W Walker & Sons refurbished soundboards of Great Organ reeds and mixtures.
 1994	A J Carter refurbished the Great flue soundboards.
 1999	Nicholson in collaboration with A J Carter installed new console; octave & sub-octave couplers to Swell and Solo, and the Echo to Choir and Echo to Pedal couplers were removed. Blowing plant refurbished.
 2000	A J Carter, Wakefield restored Great main action.

Gallery

See also

Grade I listed buildings in South Yorkshire
Listed buildings in Doncaster (Town Ward)
List of new churches by George Gilbert Scott in Northern England
Mary Frances Heaton (1801-1878), who insulted Rev. John Sharpe, for which she was in 1837 committed to an insane asylum and never released

References

External links

 
 Facts and pictures of Doncaster Minster on Skyscrapernews.com
 National Pipe Organ Register – Details of the Doncaster Schulze
 Panoramic view of the sanctuary, St George's Minster

Buildings and structures in Doncaster
Grade I listed churches in South Yorkshire
Churches completed in 1858
Rebuilt churches in the United Kingdom
19th-century Church of England church buildings
Church of England church buildings in South Yorkshire
George Gilbert Scott buildings
Major Churches Network